Frank Sibley may refer to:

Francis Sibley (1930–2019), musician and scholar of literary criticism
Frank Sibley (footballer) (born 1947), player and manager for Queen's Park Rangers
Frank Sibley (philosopher) (1923–1996), professor of philosophy at Lancaster University